Sébastien Morel, born 21 January 1981 in Vichy (Allier), is a French rugby union and sevens player who plays as a centre for La Rochelle (1.80 m, 88 kg).

Career 
 Until 2005 : ASM Clermont
 Since 2005 : Stade rochelais

Honours

Club 
 Finalist of the final phase of Pro D2 : 2007

National team 
 France team in rugby sevens

External links 
  LES BLEUS SEVENS, site of the French Rugby Sevens Team
  Player profile at lequipe.fr
  Statistics at itsrugby.fr
 

French rugby union players
French rugby sevens players
Rugby union centres
People from Vichy
1981 births
Living people
Stade Rochelais players
France international rugby sevens players
Male rugby sevens players
Sportspeople from Allier
US Carcassonne players